= Election of Donald Trump =

Election of Donald Trump may refer to:

- 2016 United States presidential election
- 2024 United States presidential election
